Valea Vadului may refer to the following places:

 Valea Vadului, a river in Constanța County, tributary of the Black Sea
 Valea Vadului, another name for the upper course of the river Ocolișel in Cluj County
 Valea Vadului, a village in the commune Iara, Cluj County